Agustín Daniel Occhiato (born 8 July 1997) is an Argentine professional footballer who plays as a forward.

Career
After progressing through Almirante Brown's youth ranks from 2011, Occhiato was promoted into the senior set-up in the 2017–18 campaign under manager Lorenzo Ojeda. He was selected six times that season, including for his professional debut on 8 October 2017 versus San Miguel. A loan move to Italian Serie C's Potenza fell through in late-2018, which coincided with the forward suffering a cruciate ligament injury. In January 2020, Occhiato was loaned to Primera C Metropolitana side Deportivo Laferrere. Six appearances followed, prior to Occhiato sealing a move to Italy with Sambenedettese.

Personal life
Occhiato is the brother of television presenter Nicolás Occhiato, who participated in and won Bailando 2019.

Career statistics
.

References

1997 births
Living people
People from La Matanza Partido
Argentine footballers
Association football forwards
Argentine expatriate footballers
Expatriate footballers in Italy
Argentine expatriate sportspeople in Italy
Primera B Metropolitana players
Primera C Metropolitana players
Club Almirante Brown footballers
Deportivo Laferrere footballers
A.S. Sambenedettese players
Sportspeople from Buenos Aires Province